Great Army may refer to:

Grande Armée, army commanded by Napoleon during the Napoleonic Wars in the 19th century
Great Heathen Army, coalition of Norse warriors that originated from Sweden, Norway, and Denmark in the 9th century
Ejército Grande, an Argentine coalition army under the command of Justo José de Urquiza in 1852